Jorge Vargas may refer to:

Jorge Vargas (basketball) (born 1942), Peruvian Olympic basketball player
 (1941-2009), Mexican actor
Jorge B. Vargas (1890–1980), Filipino lawyer and youth advocate
Jorge Vargas (footballer, born 1976), Chilean football defender
Jorge Vargas (footballer, born 1981), Ecuadorian football defender
Jorge Vargas (footballer, born 1993), Guatemalan football midfielder